Amblyseius juliae is a species of mite in the family Phytoseiidae.

References

juliae
Articles created by Qbugbot
Animals described in 1983